Bethel Township is one of the twelve townships of Miami County, Ohio, United States.  The 2010 census found 4,843 people in the township.

Geography
Located in the southeastern corner of the county, it borders the following townships:
Elizabeth Township - north
Pike Township, Clark County - northeast
Bethel Township, Clark County - east
Huber Heights - south
Vandalia - southwest
Monroe Township - west
Staunton Township - northwest

Part of the city of Huber Heights is located in southwestern Bethel Township, and three unincorporated communities are located in the township:
Brandt, in the south
Phoneton, in the southwest
West Charleston, in the west

Name and history
Statewide, other Bethel Townships are located in Clark and Monroe counties.

Government

The township is governed by a three-member board of trustees, who are elected in November of odd-numbered years to a four-year term beginning on the following January 1. Two are elected in the year after the presidential election and one is elected in the year before it. There is also an elected township fiscal officer, who serves a four-year term beginning on April 1 of the year after the election, which is held in November of the year before the presidential election. Vacancies in the fiscal officership or on the board of trustees are filled by the remaining trustees.  The trustees also select a township administrator.

As of July, 2020, the trustees are Beth van Haaren, Carolyn Wright and Don Black, the fiscal officer is Deborah Watson, and the township administrator is Andy Ehrhart.

Schools

Students in Bethel Township attend Bethel Local Schools in Bethel Township or Miami East Local Schools in Casstown or Tecumseh Local Schools in New Carlisle.

Notable residents
The township was the home of the ancestors of Wilbur and Orville Wright, who developed the first successful airplane.

References

External links
Township website
County website
Bethel Local Schools

Townships in Miami County, Ohio
Townships in Ohio